Suffolk Manor Apartments is a historic apartment building located in the Ogontz neighborhood of Philadelphia, Pennsylvania.  It is a six-story, 138 unit, steel frame and brick building on a stone foundation, built in 1930 in the Tudor Revival style.  It is in an "H" plan form, with five sections, 84 feet, 6 inches, deep, and 328, 8 inches, wide. It features a crenelated parapet, half timbering with stucco infill, stone buttressing, and a main entrance with heavy oak double doors in an Elizabethan arch.

It was added to the National Register of Historic Places in 2002.

References

Residential buildings on the National Register of Historic Places in Philadelphia
Tudor Revival architecture in Pennsylvania
Residential buildings completed in 1930
Olney-Oak Lane, Philadelphia